Phir Milenge may refer to:
 Phir Milenge (1942 film), a social drama by Sohrab Modi
 Phir Milenge (2004 film), a drama directed by Revathi

See also 
 "Phir Milenge Chalte Chalte", a 2008 song from Rab Ne Bana Di Jodi